Mathéo Vroman (born 19 November 2001) is a French professional footballer who plays as a forward for Belgian National Division 1 club RAAL La Louvière.

References

2001 births
Living people
French footballers
Association football forwards
Royal Excel Mouscron players
RAAL La Louvière players
Belgian Pro League players
Challenger Pro League players
Belgian National Division 1 players
People from Villeneuve-d'Ascq
Sportspeople from Nord (French department)
Footballers from Hauts-de-France